Cheryl Dunn is an American documentary filmmaker and photographer. She has had three books of photographs published: Bicycle Gangs of New York (2005), Some Kinda Vocation (2007) and Festivals are Good (2015).

Early life and education
Dunn was born in New Jersey. She graduated from Rutgers University in New Jersey with a BFA in art history.

Career and work
After moving to New York City in the mid 1980s, Dunn spent a large part of her career documenting city streets and the people who leave their mark there: graffiti writers, artists, skaters, boxers, bikers, protesters, and assorted characters. In the late 1990s she began to focus on filmmaking, creating films about artists of her generation who have influenced urban life through their own work.

Her films have played at film festivals including, Tribeca, Edinburgh, Rotterdam, Hotdocs, Los Angeles, Havana, and on PBS.

Dunn's work has been exhibited at Tate Modern in London, Deitch Projects in New York City, and the Art in the Streets exhibition at the Geffen Contemporary MOCA.

She was one of the subjects in the documentary, book, and traveling museum exhibition Beautiful Losers.

Her documentary film Everybody Street (2013) about photographers who have used New York City streets as a major subject in their work. The film includes Bruce Davidson, Jill Freedman, Joel Meyerowitz, Bruce Gilden, Mary Ellen Mark, Jamel Shabazz, Ricky Powell, Martha Cooper, Elliot Erwitt, Rebecca Lepkoff, Boogie, Clayton Patterson, Jeff Mermelstein with Max Kozloff and Lucy Sante. Everybody Street world-premiered at Hot Docs Canadian International Documentary Festival in Toronto in spring 2013. It was since shown at Seaport Museum of New York, NY, 2010; Format International Photography Festival, Derby, UK, 2011; Tate Modern London, July 2011; HotDocs, Canadian International Documentary Film Festival, 2013; T-Mobile New Horizons Film Festival, Wroclaw, Poland, 2013; Raindance Film Festival, London, 2013; FOAM Unseen Festival, Amsterdam, 2013; Atlanta Celebrates Photography, Atlanta, 2013; Independent Photography Festival, Melbourne, 2013; Raindance International Film Festival, Berlin, 2013; Nitehawk Cinema, New York, 2013; Cinefamily, Los Angeles, 2013; Miami Street Photography Festival, Miami, 2013; Miami Beach Cinematheque, Miami, 2013; ARTEFIERA at Cineteca Bologna, Bologna, Italy, 2014; Los Angeles Center of Photography (LACP), Los Angeles, 2014; ICA, London, 2014; Gene Siskel Theater, Chicago, 2014; FilmBar, Phoenix, 2014; Rialto Theater, Amsterdam, 2014; Hollywood Theatre Portland, 2014; The Hepworth Wakefield, Wakefield, UK, 2014; Bloor Hot Docs Cinema, Toronto, 2014; Salem Film Festival, Salem, 2014; Kentucky Museum of Art & Culture, Louisville, 2014; EPOS International Art Film Festival, Tel Aviv, 2014; Utah Museum of Fine Arts, Salt Lake City, 2014.

Filmography

Pro Abortion by Susan Cienciolo (shot and directed segment). Shown at Rotterdam International Film Festival 2-1997; Edinburgh Film Festival 9-1996.
 Sped. Shown at Moving Pictures. Dagkrant – 26th International Film Festival Rotterdam 1997; Raygun screening Los Angeles, CA Feb 18, 1997; Edinburgh International Film Fest Scotland 8-1999, 8–2001.
 Adventure Divas, Havana Film Festival 12-1999
 Backworlds for Words. Shown at Edinburgh International Film Festival, Scotland 8-1999; Dance on Screen Film Fest, London 11-1999; Cut and Paste Film Festival. Iowa City, IA, 2000.
 Peace Consideration Community. Shown at Mirror ball Endinberg International Film Fest & Pre-feature presentations throughout the UK 1999; Warchild Benefit for the Yugoslavian refugee Program, 1999.
Come Mute (10 min.) for the film Beautiful Losers. Shown at Res Screenings. Los Angeles, CA. 2005; Athens International Dance Film Festival 2004; Los Angeles Film Festival 2004.
 Bicycle Gangs of NY (2005). Shown at Garden State Film Festival, cell phones and train stations throughout the Republic of China, and Taiwan. March 2006; Tribeca Film Festival New York, NY. 2005; Darklight Film Festival, Dublin, Ireland. 2005; Raindance Film Festival, London, England. 2005; Palm Springs International Festival of Short Films, Palm Springs, CA. 2005; Bicycle Film Festival, San Francisco, CA, 2005.
 Creative Life Store, Yerba Buena Center for the Arts, San Francisco, CA; included in package for the book, Some Kind of Vocation (2007)
 Everybody Street (2013)
Moments Like This Never Last (2020) – about Dash Snow

Solo exhibitions 
 Spit and Peanut Shells - American Pictures, Country Club, Cincinnati, Ohio, 2009
 Uncanny, Galleria Patricia Armocida, Milan, Italy, 2011

Publications
 Bicycle Gangs of New York. New York, NY: Distributed Art Publishers, 2005. 
 Some Kinda Vocation. Brooklyn, NY: Picturebox, Iconoclast, 2007. 
 Uncanny, split book with Alessandro Zuek Simonetti, SM, Milan, Italy, 2011.
 Festivals are Good. New York, NY: Damiani, 2015.

References

External links
 
 The Citrus Report – interview with Dunn
 Wonderland Art Space Copenhagen – interview with Dunn
 "American Grit: Cheryl Dunn documents the irony of life in the U.S." at City Beat
 Juxtapoz Magazine – interview with Dunn

American film directors
Living people
Photographers from New York City
Rutgers University alumni
Year of birth missing (living people)
American women photographers
American women film directors
21st-century American women